The Penn Central Transportation Company, commonly abbreviated to Penn Central, was an American class I railroad that operated from 1968 to 1976. Penn Central combined three traditional corporate rivals (the Pennsylvania, New York Central and the New York, New Haven and Hartford railroads), all united by heavy service into the New York metropolitan area and (to a lesser extent) New England and Chicago.  The new company failed barely two years after formation, the largest bankruptcy in U.S. history at the time.  The Penn Central's railroad assets were nationalized into Conrail along with the other bankrupt northeastern roads; its real estate and insurance holdings successfully reorganized into American Premier Underwriters.

History

Pre-merger 
The Penn Central railroad system developed in response to challenges facing northeastern American railroads during the late 1960s. While railroads elsewhere in North America drew revenues from long-distance shipments of commodities such as coal, lumber, paper and iron ore, railroads in the densely-populated northeast traditionally depended on a heterogeneous mix of services, including:

 commuter/intercity passenger rail service
 Railway Express Agency freight service
 Break-bulk freight service via boxcars
 Consumer goods and perishables (produce and dairy products)

These labor-intensive, short-haul services proved vulnerable to competition from automobiles, buses, and trucks, a threat recently invigorated by the new limited-access highways authorized in the Federal-Aid Highway Act of 1956.  At the same time, contemporary railroad regulation restricted the extent to which U.S. railroads could react to the new market conditions.  Changes to passenger fares and freight shipment rates required approval from the capricious Interstate Commerce Commission (ICC), as did mergers or abandonment of lines. Merger, which eliminated duplicative back office employees, seemed an escape.

The situation was particularly acute for the Pennsylvania (PRR) and New York Central (NYC) railroads.  Both had extensive physical plants dedicated to their passenger custom.  As that revenue stream faded following WWII, neither could slim their assets fast enough to earn a substantial profit (although the NYC came much closer).

In 1957, the two proposed a merger, despite severe organizational and regulatory hurdles.  Neither railroad had much respect for its merger partner; the lines had fought bitterly over New York-Chicago custom and ill-will remained in the executive suites.  Amongst middle management, the company's corporate cultures all but precluded integration: a team of young, flexible managers had begun reshaping the NYC from a traditional railroad into a multimodal express-freight transporter, while the PRR continued to bet on a railroad revival.  At a technical level, the two companies served independent markets east of Cleveland (running through their namesake states), but virtually identical trackage west of Cleveland meant any merger would have anticompetitive effect.

For decades, merger proposals had tried to balance the competitors instead, joining them with lesser partners end-to-end.  The unexpected NYC+PRR proposal required all the northeastern railroads to reconsider their corporate strategy, clouding the waters for the ICC.  The resulting negotiations took nearly a decade, and when the PRR and NYC merged, they faced three competitors of comparable size: the Erie had merged with the Delaware, Lackawanna & Western to create the Erie Lackawanna Railway (EL) in 1960, the Chesapeake & Ohio Railway (C&O) acquired control of the Baltimore & Ohio (B&O) in 1963, and the Norfolk & Western Railway (N&W) absorbed several railroads, including the Nickel Plate and the Wabash, in 1964.

Regulators also required the new company to incorporate the bankrupt New York, New Haven & Hartford Railroad (NH) and New York, Susquehanna & Western Railway (NYS&W); if neither the N&W and C&O would buy the Lehigh Valley Railroad (LV), then that railroad should be incorporated as well.  (Ultimately, only the New Haven successfully joined the Penn Central; the conglomerate failed before it could incorporate the latter two.)  The only railroad leaving the Penn Central was the PRR's controlling interest in the N&W, whose dividends had generated much of the PRR's premerger profitability.

Merger begins
The legal merger (formally, an acquisition of the NYC by the PRR) concluded on February 1, 1968. The Pennsylvania Railroad, the nominal survivor of the merger, changed its name to Pennsylvania New York Central Transportation Company, and soon began using "Penn Central" as a trade name. That trade name became official a month later on May 8, 1968.  Saunders later commented: "Because of the many years it took to consummate the merger, the morale of both railroads was badly disrupted and they were faced with unmanageable problems which were insurmountable. In addition to overcoming obstacles, the principal problem was too much governmental regulation and a passenger deficit which amounted to more than $100 million a year."  

Almost immediately after the transaction cleared, the organizational headwinds presaged during the merger negotiations began to overwhelm the new corporation's management.  As ex-PRR managers began to secure the plum jobs, the forward-thinking ex-NYC managers departed for greener pastures.  Clashing union contracts prevented the company's left hand from talking to its right, and incompatible computer systems meant that PC classification clerks regularly lost track of train movements.

Subpar track conditions, the result of years of deferred maintenance, deteriorated further, particularly in the Midwest. Derailments and wrecks occurred regularly; when the trains avoided mishap, they operated far below design speed, resulting in delayed shipments and excessive overtime.  Operating costs soared, and shippers soured on the products. In 1969, most of Maine's potato production rotted in the PC's Selkirk Yard, hurting the Bangor & Aroostook Railroad, whose shippers vowed never to ship by rail again. Although both PRR and NYC had been profitable pre-merger, Penn Central was — at one point — losing $1 million per day.

As PC's management struggled to wrestle the company into submission, the structural headwinds facing all northeastern railroads continued unabated.  The industrial decline of the Rust Belt consumed shippers through the Northeast and Midwest.  Penn Central's executives tried to diversify the troubled firm into real estate and other non-railroad ventures, but in a slow economy these businesses performed little better than the original railroad assets. Worse, these new subsidiaries diverted management attention away from the problems in the core business. To create the illusion of success, management also insisted on paying dividends to shareholders, desperately borrowing funds to buy time for the business to turn around.

Bankruptcy 

Within two years, Penn Central could no longer remain solvent, and, on June 21, 1970, the nation's sixth-largest corporation had become its largest bankruptcy. (The Enron Corporation's 2001 bankruptcy eclipsed the PC in large measure).  George Drury described the bankruptcy as "a cataclysmic event, both to the railroad industry and to the nation's business community," not least because Penn Central increasingly appeared the proverbial canary in the coal mine.  Across the nation, railroads discontinued Penn Central's core business (passenger trains) as fast as regulators would let them.  The Rock Island, midway through a decade arguing a merger with regulators, was stumbling towards another stunning bankruptcy, as was the Milwaukee Road, the nation's most technologically advanced transcontinental.  In 1972, the damage from Hurricane Agnes destroyed important Penn Central branches and main lines, and pushed the other northeastern roads into bankruptcy.  By the mid-70s, no major player east of Rochester-Pittsburgh, north of Pittsburgh-Philadelphia, and southwest of the Maine-New Hampshire border remained solvent.    

Under the auspices of the U.S. Department of Transportation (U.S. DOT), Penn Central agreed to trial new technologies to revive the flagging passenger services on what would become the Northeast Corridor. PC continued to operate the PRR's Metroliner service between New York City and DC, and introduced a new United Aircraft TurboTrain between New York City and Boston.  But the new equipment proved useless without high-quality track to run it on, or a railroad capable of releasing schedules to the ticket-seeking public. In response, the Nixon administration developed Amtrak, which relieved any railroad that desired it of the obligation to operate passenger service.    

PC unsuccessfully attempted to sell-off the air rights to Grand Central Terminal, and allow developers to build skyscrapers above the terminal, in order to fund continued operations. The resulting lawsuit, Penn Central Transportation Co. v. New York City, was decided in 1978, when the U.S. Supreme Court ruled that PC could not sell Grand Central's air rights because the terminal was a New York City designated landmark.

In May 1974, the bankruptcy court concluded that the railroad of operations of PC could never provide enough income to reorganize the company.  In the Regional Rail Reorganization Act of 1973, the federal government nationalized Penn Central to save it.  For two years, the United States Railway Association sorted through the assets of PC (and six other bankrupt railroads: EL, LV, Reading, Lehigh & Hudson River Railway, Central Railroad of New Jersey and Pennsylvania-Reading Seashore Lines) to decide what could be reshaped into a viable railroad.  Then, on April 1, 1976, Penn Central transferred those rail operations to the government-owned Consolidated Rail Corporation (Conrail). 

Facing the continued loss of market share to the trucking industry, the railroad industry and its unions asked the federal government for deregulation. The 1980 Staggers Act, which deregulated the railroad industry, proved to be a key factor in bringing Conrail and the old PC assets back to life. During the 1980s, the deregulated Conrail had the muscle to implement the route reorganization and productivity improvements that the PC had unsuccessfully tried to implement between 1968 and 1970. Hundred of miles of former PRR and NYC trackage were abandoned to adjacent landowners or rail trail use. The stock of the subsequently-profitable Conrail was refloated on Wall Street in 1987, and the company operated as an independent, private-sector railroad from 1987 to 1999.

Corporate survival

The Pennsylvania Railroad absorbed the New York Central Railroad on February 1, 1968, and at the same time changed its name to Pennsylvania New York Central Transportation Company to reflect this. The trade name of "Penn Central" was adopted, and, on May 8, the former Pennsylvania Railroad was officially renamed the Penn Central Company.

The first Penn Central Transportation Company (PCTC) was incorporated on April 1, 1969, and its stock was assigned to a new holding company called Penn Central Holding Company. On October 1, 1969, the Penn Central Company, the former Pennsylvania Railroad, absorbed the first PCTC and was renamed the second Penn Central Transportation Company the next day;  the Penn Central Holding Company became the second Penn Central Company. Thus, the company that was formerly the Pennsylvania Railroad became the first Penn Central Company and then became the second PCTC.

The old Pennsylvania Company, a holding company chartered in 1870, reincorporated in 1958 and long a subsidiary of the PRR, remained a separate corporate entity throughout the period following the merger.

The former Pennsylvania Railroad, now the second PCTC, gave up its railroad assets to Conrail in 1976 and absorbed its legal owner, the second Penn Central Company, in 1978, and at the same time changed its name to The Penn Central Corporation. In the 1970s and 1980s, the company now called The Penn Central Corporation was a small conglomerate that largely consisted of the diversified sub-firms it had before the crash.

Among the properties the company owned when Conrail was created were the Buckeye Pipeline and a 24 percent stake in Madison Square Garden (which stands above Penn Station) and its prime tenants, the New York Knicks basketball team and New York Rangers hockey team, along with Six Flags Theme Parks. Though the company retained ownership of some rights-of-way and station properties connected with the railroads, it continued to liquidate these and eventually concentrated on one of its subsidiaries in the insurance business.

The former Pennsylvania Railroad changed its name to American Premier Underwriters in March, 1994. It became part of Carl Lindner’s Cincinnati financial empire American Financial Group.

Grand Central Terminal

Until late 2006, American Financial Group still owned Grand Central Terminal, though all railroad operations were managed by the Metropolitan Transportation Authority (MTA). The U.S. Surface Transportation Board approved the sale of several of American Financial Group's remaining railroad assets to Midtown TDR Ventures LLC, an investment group controlled by Argent Ventures, in December 2006. The current lease with the MTA was negotiated to last through February 28, 2274. The MTA paid $2.4 million annually in rent in 2007 and had an option to buy the station and tracks in 2017, although Argent could extend the date another 15 years to 2032. The platforms and yards extend for several blocks north of the terminal building under numerous streets and existing buildings leasing air rights, including the MetLife Building and Waldorf-Astoria Hotel.

In November 2018, the MTA proposed purchasing the Hudson and Harlem Lines as well as the Grand Central Terminal for up to $35.065 million, plus a discount rate of 6.25%. The purchase would include all inventory, operations, improvements, and maintenance associated with each asset, except for the air rights over Grand Central. The MTA's finance committee approved the proposed purchase on November 13, 2018, and the purchase was approved by the full board two days later. The deal finally closed in March 2020, with the MTA taking ownership of the terminal and rail lines.

Heritage
Few railroad historians and former employees view the mega-railroad's brief existence favorably, and the company has little presence in the railroad enthusiast press. The preservation group Penn Central Railroad Historical Society was formed in July 2000 to preserve the history of the often-scorned company.

As part of Norfolk Southern Railway's 30th anniversary, the railroad painted 20 new locomotives utilizing former liveries of predecessor railroads. Unit number 1073, a SD70ACe, is painted in a Penn Central Heritage scheme.

See also

Alfred E. Perlman - PC President
Stuart T. Saunders - PC Chairman & CEO
History of rail transport in the United States
Penn Central Transportation Co. v. New York City (1978 Supreme Court case)

References

Further reading

External links

 
Railway companies established in 1968
Railway companies disestablished in 1976
Former Class I railroads in the United States
Defunct Connecticut railroads
Defunct Delaware railroads
Defunct Washington, D.C., railroads
Defunct Illinois railroads
Defunct Indiana railroads
Defunct Kentucky railroads
Defunct Maryland railroads
Defunct Massachusetts railroads
Defunct Michigan railroads
Defunct New Jersey railroads
Defunct New York (state) railroads
Defunct Ohio railroads
Defunct Ontario railways
Defunct Pennsylvania railroads
Defunct Quebec railways
Defunct Rhode Island railroads
Defunct Virginia railroads
Defunct West Virginia railroads
Railroads in the Chicago metropolitan area
Railroads transferred to Conrail
Predecessors of Conrail
Defunct Missouri railroads
Defunct companies based in Pennsylvania
Companies that filed for Chapter 11 bankruptcy in 1970
Conrail
Companies based in Philadelphia
1968 establishments in the United States